The Malta national baseball team is the national baseball team of Malta. The team represents Malta in international competitions. It is governed by the Malta Baseball and Softball Association  (MABS), and is also a member nation of the Confederation of European Baseball.

Tournament results

European Under-21 Baseball Championship

References

Baseball
National baseball teams in Europe
National baseball teams